The  is a single-car diesel multiple unit (DMU) train type operated on local regional services by Shikoku Railway Company (JR Shikoku) in Japan since 2008. The fleet of 18 cars was converted from former 1000 series DMU cars to allow operation in conjunction with newly delivered 1500 series DMU cars.

Operations
The 1200 series trains are used on the following JR Shikoku lines.
 Kōtoku Line
 Tokushima Line
 Mugi Line
 Dosan Line

Interior
As with the 1000 series cars, passenger accommodation consists of a mixture of longitudinal bench seating on one side and transverse seating bays on the opposite side. All of the 1200 series cars have toilets.

History
Between June and October 2008, 18 former 1000 series cars, themselves built between 1992 and 1997 were modified to make them compatible with newly delivered 1500 series DMU cars. They were also repainted in a new livery of unpainted stainless steel with green highlights on the driving cab ends and passenger doorways.

References

External links

 1200 series details on JR Shikoku website 

1200 series
1200 series
Train-related introductions in 2008
Niigata Transys rolling stock

ja:JR四国1000形気動車